Paul Adams (born ) is a politician and former rally driving champion from New Zealand.

Early years
Adams was originally a carpenter and joiner, but later established a business manufacturing outdoor playground equipment. Later, he became a professional rally driver, and won three prestigious New Zealand championships. He also owned a Kia Motors and Suzuki dealerships in Auckland.

Member of Parliament

Adams is a member of Pentecostal City Impact Church, and as a result, became involved in Christian politics in New Zealand. After first being a member of the Christian Heritage Party, he joined the religious-based Future New Zealand party. Future New Zealand later merged with United New Zealand to form the modern United Future New Zealand group, which Adams remained a member of until 2005. In the 2002 election, Adams was ranked ninth on the United Future party list. Thanks to the unexpectedly strong performance of United Future, the party gained enough votes for eight seats, leaving Adams just outside Parliament. Later, Kelly Chal, a higher-ranked candidate, was forced to withdraw because she did not have New Zealand citizenship, which she had not realised was necessary. Adams, as the next candidate on the list, entered Parliament in her place.

Adams was one of the more conservative members of Parliament. After he was elected, it was reported that he had made a written submission on the 1993 Human Rights Bill saying that people with AIDS should not be allowed to "run loose". He also spoke out about subjects like abortion, and fasted for 21 days to oppose the civil unions legislation, which was passed regardless.

Independent
On 15 August 2005 Adams left United Future to stand as an independent in the East Coast Bays Electorate. He gained 5809 votes after a short five-week campaign, which placed him third overall. He was subsequently involved with a proposed new party to be established by his former colleague Gordon Copeland and Destiny New Zealand. However, these negotiations collapsed, but Adams then became the Deputy Leader of The Family Party.

Adams stood as a candidate for The Family Party in the East Coast Bays Electorate in the 2008 election.

On 9 November 2008 general election, Paul Adams was again unsuccessful as Family Party candidate for the East Coast Bays electorate. He polled third, behind National candidate Murray McCully and Labour candidate Vivienne Goldsmith. As The Family Party failed to win any other electorate or list seats, Adams did not re-enter Parliament.

References

United Future MPs
New Zealand rally drivers
1940s births
Living people
Year of birth uncertain
The Family Party politicians
Christian Democrat Party (New Zealand) politicians
New Zealand list MPs
Members of the New Zealand House of Representatives
Unsuccessful candidates in the 2008 New Zealand general election
Unsuccessful candidates in the 2005 New Zealand general election
New Zealand real estate agents
21st-century New Zealand politicians